The Loky River, also known as the Lokia River, is located in northern Madagascar. It drains in the north-eastern coast, into the Indian Ocean.

It is crossed by the RN 5a near Anivorano du Nord. Its mouth is situated in Lokia Bay.

References 

Rivers of Madagascar
Sava Region